Kõivu is a village in Luunja Parish, Tartu County in eastern Estonia.

Violinist Eduard Sõrmus (1878–1940), was born in Kõivu.

References

 

Villages in Tartu County